Puncak Perdana is a main township in the northern part of Shah Alam municipal area in Selangor, Malaysia. It is located halfway between Meru and the Subang Airport, and is also adjacent to Setia Alam.

Facilities
Uitm Puncak Perdana is located in here.

Townships in Selangor